Gazabad (also Romanized as Gazābād; also known as Gazābād-e Deh Sheykh) is a village in Khatunabad Rural District, in the Central District of Jiroft County, Kerman Province, Iran. At the 2006 census, its population was 188, in 47 families.

References 

Populated places in Jiroft County